Lílian Lopes Pereira is the winner of Miss Brasil International 2010 title, after being crowned first runner-up at Miss Brasil 2010 in the Memorial da América Latina in São Paulo on May 8, 2010.

She represented Brazil at Miss International 2010, the 50th Miss International pageant, which was held in Chengdu, China on October, 2010.

References
 

1991 births
Living people
Miss International 2010 delegates
Brazilian beauty pageant winners